Berlin is the most populous city in the European Union, as calculated by city-proper population (not metropolitan area).

Demographics

Population by borough

Historical development of Berlin's population

The spike in population in 1920 is a result of the Greater Berlin Act.

Population by nationality 
On 31 December 2010 the largest groups by foreign nationality were citizens from Turkey (104,556), Poland (40,988), Serbia (19,230), Italy (15,842), Russia (15,332), United States (12,733), France (13,262), Vietnam (13,199), Croatia (10,104), Bosnia and Herzegovina (10,198), UK (10,191), Greece (9,301), Austria (9,246), Ukraine (8,324), Lebanon (7,078), Spain (7,670), Bulgaria (9,988), the People's Republic of China (5,632), Thailand (5,037). There is also a large Arabic community, mostly from Lebanon, Palestine and Iraq. Additionally, Berlin has one of the largest Vietnamese communities outside Vietnam, with about 83,000 people of Vietnamese origin.

See also 
Demographics of Berlin
Demographics of Cologne
Demographics of Hamburg
Demographics of Munich

References

External links
 Berlin State Statistical Office
 Berlin State Statistical Office (old homepage)
 Schwenk, Herbert, Berliner Stadtentwicklung von A bis Z: Kleines Handbuch zum Werden und Wachsen der deutschen Hauptstadt, 2nd edition. Berlin: Luisenstädtischer Bildungsverein, 1998.

Geography of Berlin
History of Berlin
Demographics of Germany
Demographics by city